Thirumittacode-II is a village in the Palakkad district, state of Kerala, India. Together with Thirumittacode-I, it is administered by the Thirumittacode gram panchayat.

Demographics
 India census, Thirumittacode-II had a population of 11,255 with 5,283 males and 5,972 females.

References

Villages in Palakkad district